A melliferous flower is a plant which produces substances that can be collected by insects and turned into honey. Many plants are melliferous, but only certain examples can be harvested by honey bees, because of their physiognomy (body size and shape, length of proboscis, etc.). Apiculture classifies a plant as melliferous if it can be harvested by domesticated honey bees.

The table below lists some of the known melliferous plants, and indicates the flowering period, as well as the resources harvested by bees (nectar, pollen, propolis, and honeydew). Each plant does not produce the same quantity or quality of these resources, and even among species the production can vary due to region, plant health, climate, etc.

Plant table

Plains plants

Mediterranean plants

Mountain plants

Cultured plants

References 

Beekeeping